Pilbrow is a surname. Notable people with the surname include:

Arthur Pilbrow (1902–1987), British fencer
Ashleigh Pilbrow (1912–1995), British track and field athlete
Richard Pilbrow (born 1933), British stage lighting designer, author, theatre design consultant, and theatrical producer, film producer and television producer.